The Israeli Beasts are the national team of Israel in Australian rules football. 

Israel competes in the European league governed by AFL Europe.

Team symbols 

Team's mascot is a mighty creature, caught in the middle of the game carrying the ball forward. The colours of the logo are traditional for Israel white and blue, with the classic Aussie rules red ball in one of his paws.

Team history 
The team was formed in May 2019 ahead of the AFL Euro Cup 2019 by the platform OddBalls and the management of the Tel Aviv Cheetahs football club.

The first practice took place on May 24th at the Rugby Field in HaYarkon Park, Tel Aviv.

References

National Australian rules football teams
Australian rules football